Paul Davidson may refer to:

 Paul Davidson (author) (born 1971), American author and blogger
 Paul Davidson (businessman) (born 1947), English CEO
 Paul "The Plumber" Davidson (born 1955), British businessman
 Paul Davidson (economist) (born 1930), American macroeconomist
 Paul Davidson (producer) (1867–1927), German film producer
 Paul Davidson (rugby league) (born 1970),  English rugby league footballer
Paul Davidson, character in 31 North 62 East

See also
Paul Davison (born 1971), snooker player
John-Paul Davidson (born 1953), director, producer and writer